Marco Battista Battaglini (25 March 1645 – 19 September 1717) was an Italian jurist and priest, known as a historian of the church councils. He served as Bishop of Cesena (1716–1717) and Bishop of Nocera Umbra (1690–1716).

Biography
Marco Battista Battaglini was born on 25 Mar 1646 in Rimini, Italy.  He studied law at Cesena, both civil and ecclesiastical, and at the age of sixteen he obtained the degree of Doctor of Civil and Canon Law. After some years of service in the civil administration of the Papal States, he entered the priesthood. On 17 Apr 1690, he was appointed Bishop of Nocera Umbra by Pope Alexander VIII.
On 7 May 1690, he was consecrated bishop by Gasparo Carpegna, Cardinal-Priest of Santa Maria in Trastevere.

On 8 Jun 1716, he was transferred by Pope Clement XI to the Diocese of Cesena.

He served as Bishop of Cesena until his death on 19 Sep 1717. at Cesena.

Works

His principal works are:

"Il legista filosofo" (Rome, 1680), or the man of law as a philosopher; 
"Istoria universale di tutti i concilii" (Venice, 1686, 1689, 1696, 1714). The first edition contained the history of 475 councils; in subsequent edition 403 more were added. In a supplement was a catalogue of all the ancient and contemporary episcopal sees.
"Annali del sacerdozio e dell' imperio intorno all' intero secolo decimo settimo" (Venice, 1701–11; Ancona, 1742), or history of the world during the seventeenth century in the form of annals.

References 

Attribution
 The entry cites:
Hugo von Hurter, Nomenclator, II; 
Bauer in Kirchenlexikon

External links and additional sources
 (for Chronology of Bishops) 
 (for Chronology of Bishops) 
 (for Chronology of Bishops) 
 (for Chronology of Bishops) 

1645 births
1717 deaths
Bishops of Cesena
17th-century Italian historians
17th-century Italian Roman Catholic bishops
18th-century Italian Roman Catholic bishops
17th-century Italian jurists
18th-century Italian jurists
Bishops appointed by Pope Alexander VIII
Bishops appointed by Pope Clement XI
18th-century Italian historians